The Monywa University of Economics, located in Monywa, Sagaing Region, is one of four universities of economics and business in Myanmar. The university offers undergraduate and graduate degrees and diplomas, mostly in commerce, statistics and economics. It also has a small stable of graduate degree programs, including a full-time MBA program.

History
For the purpose of offering the economics academia easily to the students from upper Myanmar, an economics college was founded in the east of Monywa, south of Kyaukka Road, on 200 acres of land near Za Loke village, on 1 July 1993.

Then on 28 September,  the Ministry of Education upgraded the Monywa Economics College to the Monywa Institute of Economics. The university has been established as a university that provides economists for national development.

On 3 September 2014,  the Monywa Institute of Economics was renamed as Monywa University of Economics. The Monywa University of Economics has opened the first MPA and MBA programs as the economics universities and is one of the country's well-known economics universities in upper Myanmar.

Programs
The university mainly offers PhD, bachelor's degree and undergraduate diploma programs. Regular bachelor's degree programs take four years and Honors programs take five years. The master's programs take two years. The PhD programs take five years. The university's Human Resource Development (HRD) Center offers undergraduate diploma and certificate programs in Certificate in Advanced Business Studies (CABS), Post-Graduate Diploma in Development Studies (Dip.DS), Post-Graduate Diploma in Research Studies(DBS), etc.

Overview

Certificate in Advanced Business Studies (CABS) 
This programme is meant for the staff working under the Ministries of Myanmar, for the entrepreneurs, NGO staff and the staff members from other private companies and organizations so as to enable them learnEconomics.

 The candidate must have passed Basic Education High School Examination (BEHS).
 The candidates must have a graduate degree under any discipline from a recognized university or an institute.
 After the completion of this programme, Certificate in Advanced Business Studies (CABS)will be given to the candidates.
 The duration of the course is three months.
 The class hours are from 05:00 pm to 07:00 pm from Monday to Friday.

Post-Graduate Diploma in Development Studies (Dip.DS) 
This programme is meant for the staff working under the Ministries of Myanmar, for the entrepreneurs, NGO staff and the staff members from other private companies and organizations so as to enable them learn the development studies.

 The candidates must have a graduate degree under any discipline from a recognized university.
 After the completion of this programme, Post-Graduate Diploma in Development Studies (Dip.DS) will be given to the candidates.
 The duration this programme is nine months. Each semester will take three months and the candidates have to be completed all three semesters.
 The class hours are from 07:00 am to 09:00 pm from Monday to Friday.

Master of Business Administration (MBA) and Master of Public Administration (MPA) 
The eligibility criteria for admissions to the MBA and MPAprogramme

The candidates must have a graduate degree under any discipline from a recognized university and must have two years of working experience at a minimum.

The candidates cannot be a trainee in any course in other university.

The candidates have to attend the class periods in accordance with the curriculum.

For MBA admission, those who are working at the managerial level will be prioritized.

For MPA admission, those who are working in NGOs, INGOs, United Nation Organizations and the Government of Myanmar are prioritized.

If the candidate is an administrative staff, the recommendation of his or her Department Head is required.

See also
 Yangon University of Economics
 Meiktila University of Economics

References

Universities and colleges in Monywa
Universities and colleges in Sagaing Region
Business schools in Myanmar
Universities and colleges in Myanmar
Educational institutions established in 1998
1998 establishments in Myanmar